Channel 29 refers to several television stations:

Canada
The following television stations operate on virtual channel 29 in Canada:
 CFTF-DT in Rivière-du-Loup, Quebec
 CFTU-DT in Montreal, Quebec
 CHNM-DT-1 in Victoria, British Columbia
 CIII-DT-29 in Sarnia-Oil Springs, Ontario

Mexico
The following television stations operate on virtual channel 29 in Mexico:
 XHENB-TDT in Ensenada, Baja California 
 XHMAP-TDT in Monclova, Coahuila (assigned)

Philippines
 DZRJ-TV (RJTV 29)

Other
 Channel 29 virtual TV stations in the United States
For UHF frequencies covering 561.25-565.75 MHz
 Channel 29 TV stations in Canada
 Channel 29 TV stations in Mexico
 Channel 29 digital TV stations in the United States
 Channel 29 low-power TV stations in the United States

29